Abbasabad (also Romanized as ‘Abbāsābād) is a village within the borders of the Avarzaman Rural District, of the Samen District, in Malayer County of the Hamadan Province in Iran. At the 2006 census, its population was 21, in 5 families.

References 

Populated places in Malayer County